Scandal is a one-off album released in 2006 by Kangta & Vanness, a duo composed of Korean singer Kangta and Taiwanese singer Vanness Wu.  Several of the songs on Scandal were recorded in both Korean and Mandarin, and two music videos were produced.  The disc was released in South Korea, Taiwan, Hong Kong, and Japan.

The Mandarin version of "Scandal" was nominated for Top 10 Gold Songs at the Hong Kong TVB8 Awards, presented by television station TVB8, in 2006.

Release and promotion
Scandal was recorded and produced in South Korea under SM Entertainment.  Kangta & Vanness debuted the music of Scandal at the 2006 MTV Asia Awards in Bangkok, Thailand on 2006  May, during which they performed the album's title track during the ceremony closing.  They officially launched the album at "The 1st Showcase Scandal" on 2006  May at Yonsei University in Seoul, South Korea, at which they performed "Scandal" and "127 Days."  On 2006  May, Scandal was released by SM Entertainment in South Korea.  It contained five Korean-language songs plus the title track also in English.  A music video for "Scandal" was released, which showcased a dance battle between Kangta and Vanness, and featured Korean singer Lina, from Korean girl group The Grace (band).  Later, a music video for "127 Days" was also released, featuring Lina's bandmate Stephanie.

On 2006  June, Scandal was released in Taiwan and Hong Kong, and soon thereafter in Japan, by Sony Music Taiwan.  These releases featured a different cover, Mandarin-language versions of four songs found on the original release, plus a replacement of the song "Faith..." with "One Step."  Some versions also came with bonus items such as a DVD containing the "Scandal" music video and footage from "The 1st Showcase Scandal" or merchandise from F4, the Taiwanese boyband of which Vanness is a member.  Some releases also omitted the English version of "Scandal."  Concurrently, in South Korea the "Repackage" version of Scandal was released.  It featured a third cover and contained a track listing identical to the overseas versions, plus a DVD containing Korean and Mandarin versions of the music videos for "Scandal" and "127 Days," album jacket photography footage, and scenes from the making of the "127 Days" music video.

The "Commemorative Collectible" edition of Scandal was released outside Korea on 2006  August, and was identical to Korea's "Repackage" edition.  Kangta & Vanness continued to promote Scandal across Asia throughout 2006.

Release
 May 19, 2006 (South Korea)
 June 18, 2006 (Taiwan), (Hong Kong), (repackage)
 July 4, 2006 (Japan)
 August 13, 2006 (collection)

Track listing

Credits and personnel

Studio
 Recorded, mixed, digitally edited by SM Booming System
 Mastered at Sonic Korea

Personnel

 SM Entertainment – executive producer
 Lee Soo-man – producer
 Kangta – producer , vocals, background vocals , song lyrics , composition, arrangement , digital editing, vocal director  
 Vanness – vocals, background vocals , rap lyrics , composition 
 Yoo Young-jin – producer , director , song lyrics, vocal director, background vocals , composition, arrangement, recording, mixing , digital editing , music and sound supervisor 
 Yoo Han-jin – composition, arrangement , synthesizer and programming 
 Ahn Ik-soo – arrangement , synthesizer and programming 
 Shin Soo-min – synthesizer and programming 
 Heo Jeong-hee  KAT – recording , mixing 
 Yeo Doo-hyeon – recording , mixing 
 Lee Seong-ho – mixing 
 Jeon Hoon – mastering 
 Hwang Sung-je – synthesizer and programming 
 Yoon Chi-woong – synthesizer and programming

Charts

Monthly charts

References

External links
 Kangta & Vanness' Official Site

2006 albums
SM Entertainment albums
Kangta & Vanness albums
Sony Music Taiwan albums